Vulcaniella extremella is a moth of the family Cosmopterigidae. It is found from Poland to the Iberian Peninsula, Italy, and Bulgaria and from France to central and southern Russia.

The wingspan is 8–11 mm. Adults have been recorded from mid-May to mid-September.

The larvae feed on Salvia austriaca, Salvia nemorosa tesquicola and Salvia pratensis. They mine the leaves of their host plant. The mine consists of a short corridor, generally along the midrib. When a side vein is reached an irregular, elongate blotch is made that may reach the leaf margin and causes the leaf to contract somewhat. Almost all frass is ejected through an opening in the basal part of the mine. The larva rest in a tunnel clad with silk.

In spring the larva prefer lower leaves and often change mines. In the summer, the ground leaves have died and the larva live in the stem leaves no longer changing mines.

References

External links
bladmineerders.nl
Fauna Europaea

Moths described in 1871
Vulcaniella
Moths of Europe